Peter Erik Danielsson (born 1974) is a Swedish Moderate Party politician who has served as the Mayor of Helsingborg from November 2006 to October 2022. He served as Deputy Leader of the Moderate Party from January 2015 to October 2019. He was a Member of the Riksdag from 2002 to 2006.

References

Members of the Riksdag from the Moderate Party
Living people
1974 births
Members of the Riksdag 2002–2006